The 1971 Topps Card set was a set of football cards released in 1971 by Topps. The set contains 263 cards & was the first set of football cards to acknowledge the AFL-NFL merger with the new AFC & NFC conferences. The set is most known for the rookie card of Terry Bradshaw, however there are many other valuable cards such as Joe Greene & Marty Schottenheimer's rookie card.

Appearance
Each card measured the standard 2-1/2 by 3-1/2 inches. The front of the card contained the player's name, picture, team & logo, position, & their conference. The background would be blue if they were in the NFC, & red if they were in the AFC. All-Star players had both colors for the background. The back contains the card number & personal information such as their height, birthdate, weight, residence, & rookie year. It also contained a short biography about the player, with the player's career statistics being on the bottom with the copyright.

Value
Because the card set has only a few notable cards, a complete set goes for around $1000-$13,000 depending on condition.

References

Trading cards